Brachodes nycteropis is a moth of the family Brachodidae. It is found in South Africa.

References

Endemic moths of South Africa
Moths described in 1920
Brachodidae
Moths of Africa